This is a list of cantons of Luxembourg by population density.

References

See also 
 List of cantons of Luxembourg by area
 List of cantons of Luxembourg by highest point
 List of cantons of Luxembourg by lowest point
 List of cantons of Luxembourg by population

Population density
Luxembourg, cantons